Pottankad is a village located in the Idukki district of Kerala, India. It is about 3020 ft. above sea level. A tourist destination, Munnar, is within 20 km of Pottankad. Most of the people depend on agriculture, and the main cultivations are cardamom and black pepper. 

This place is included in the Bison Valley Panchayath and the Taluk in Udumbanchola.

Nobody really knows how the name, Pottenkad, originated.

Amenities

There is one educational institution called St. Sebastian's High School, which goes from grades 1-12. A major place of worship, found right next to the school, is St. Sebastian's church. There are two financial institutions as well: the State Bank of India Pottankad Br. and the Pottankad Co-operative Bank. Because of its proximity to Munnar, Pottenkad has gotten many tourists to come to the small village, and stay in the newly added homestays and resorts.

Geography and climate
There is a river called "Uppar", which flows through this village. The origin of the river stems from a mountain called "Chokkanmudi", which is more than 6,000 ft. above sea level. The climate throughout the year ranges from 55°F - 70°F, regardless of each season. 

The seasons themselves include spring, which starts around February and ends around early March. The summer season starts in March and ends in May. From here, the monsoon season starts (from June) and ends around August. There is a fall season, from September to October, although it is not very noticeable relative to the other seasons. The last season observed is winter, which goes generally from November to the start of February. 

Most parts of the village is underdeveloped. Following a trend among the whole country of India, many of the parts are slowly becoming modernized, but will not be seen largely, until a few years. Many of the roads are not paved, and are dirt roads. There are a multitude of forests and dense amounts of trees throughout the area.

Demography
The population of Pottenkad is around 10,000 people, although that stat changes from time to time. The main religion is Christianity, but the main denomination is Roman Catholicism. There are also protestants, orthodox, which are a minority. Other religions include Hinduism and a small population of Muslims. Citing from Kunchithanny, "the majority of residents descend from settlers who migrated here from the neighboring districts of Kottayam and Ernakulam, the local food, Language and culture are similar to those of these districts. The culture constitutes one form of what is described as Hi-range culture".

Culture
Pottankad celebrates several, most of which are similar to its mother state, Kerala. Christmas, Onam, and Easter are among the most notable holidays celebrated within the region.

Transportation
The main public transportation are private buses and taxis. The nearest airport is "Nedumpassery", or  Cochin International Airport. The nearest railway station is "Aluva". The nearest port is the "Cochin Port".

Local points of interest
The nearest attraction is Munnar, Kerala, but there is also Thekkady, Kerala and the Idukki Dam.

See also
Bisonvalley
Kunchithanny

References

Villages in Idukki district